Boletín de Geología is a quarterly peer-reviewed open access scientific journal published by the Industrial University of Santander. The journal covers the geosciences, including geology, geophysics, geochemistry, and paleontology. It was established in 1958.

Abstracting and indexing
The journal is abstracted and indexed in Redalyc, SciELO, Latindex, Publindex, GeoRef, and Geoscience e-Journals.

See also

Geology of Colombia

References

Earth and atmospheric sciences journals
Geology journals
Quarterly journals
Publications established in 1958
Multilingual journals
Creative Commons Attribution-licensed journals